Bukan County is in West Azerbaijan province, Iran. The capital of the county is the city of Bukan. At the 2006 census, the county's population was 202,637 in 42,313 households. The following census in 2011 counted 224,628 people in 56,105 households. At the 2016 census, the county's population was 251,409 in 74,250 households.

The county is mostly populated by Shafi'i Kurds who speak Sorani.

The world’s shortest man originates from Bukan.

Administrative divisions

The population history of Bukan County's administrative divisions over three consecutive censuses is shown in the following table. The latest census shows two districts, seven rural districts, and two cities.

References

 

Counties of West Azerbaijan Province